= Flagpoling =

Legal term

Flagpoling refers to a legal loophole where a foreign national can "jump the queue" in accessing immigration services, work permits or other benefits in their host country. Typically, it takes weeks, months or even years to access such privileges as a temporary resident, foreign student or temporary worker when applying for such change in status within their host country.

However, if they briefly leave their host country and immediately turn-around and re-enter their host country, they may often be able to apply for such change of status for on-the-spot processing at the point of re-entry.

This is not only considered unfair to other foreign nationals who apply for such change of status through the normal channels within their host country (waiting, meanwhile, for the immigration administrative processes to unfold) – it is also an unexpected added burden on the customs and border security services of the host country who are required to process such change of status requests on the spot.

The phrase "flagpoling" is a euphemism for a foreign national leaving their host country and immediately "swinging around the flagpole" of the country they just entered and then immediately re-entering the host country they just departed from.
